The Union symbol (hieroglyph) is Gardiner sign listed no. F36, part of the series for parts of mammals. As a "union symbol", (a right and left half), it contains a vertical invisible 'centerline'. It allows for the positioning of two important hieroglyphs to be attached to it, right and left, as the uniting of two halves; specifically this is referencing Upper Egypt (by the King of the South), represented by the sedge  hieroglyph (M23) M23 and Lower Egypt (the King of the North), represented by the papyrus clump hieroglyph (M16) M16.

In Egyptian hieroglyphs, the hieroglyph is used for the phonetic value of sma, (a triliteral) with meanings of to join together, to unite with.

For its use as "uniting of two lands", it has an identical usage to the Two whips with shen ring hieroglyphAa6, which from its very construction appears as the uniting of two separate "tribes", or communities.

See also

Two whips with shen ring (hieroglyph)
Gardiner's Sign List#F. Parts of mammals
List of Egyptian hieroglyphs

References

Betrò, 1995. Hieroglyphics: The Writings of Ancient Egypt, Betrò, Maria Carmela, c. 1995, 1996-(English), Abbeville Press Publishers, New York, London, Paris (hardcover)
Budge, 1991.  A Hieroglyphic Dictionary to the Book of the Dead, E.A.Wallace Budge, Dover edition, 1991; Original: c 1911 as: "A Hieroglyphic Vocabulary to the Theban Recension of the Book of the Dead with an Index to All the English Equivalents of the Egyptian Words", (Kegan Paul, etc. Ltd, London, publisher). Dover: (softcover)
Schulz, Seidel. Egypt: The World of the Pharaohs, Editors, Regine Schulz, Matthias Seidel, Könemann Verlagsgesellschaft mbH, Cologne, English translation version. (hardcover)

Egyptian hieroglyphs: parts of mammals